The Southern Border Region is one of nine such geopolitical designations in the State of California, United States, used for economic analysis. The region is defined to include San Diego County and Imperial County, each of which borders Mexico. Its largest city is San Diego.

The Southern Border Region is adjacent to the Southern California Region, which consists of five counties (Orange, Los Angeles, San Bernardino, Riverside, and Ventura). These regions were created in about 1998, when the California Regional Economies Project identified 9 regional economies. The California Economic Strategy Panel uses employment and wage information reported by employers for public policy-making, planning, and program administration. As an example of information reported by the panel, according to the 2009 report, the gross domestic product of the region had grown 68.5% in five years. Other agencies such as the California Public Utilities Commission also provide reports for the region.

See also 

Metropolitan areas
San Diego metropolitan area
El Centro metropolitan area
San Diego–Tijuana metropolitan area
Mexicali–Calexico metropolitan area
Metropolitan planning agencies
San Diego Association of Governments
Southern California Association of Governments
List of economic regions of California

References

Bibliography 

Economic regions of California
Southern California
Regions of California
Imperial County, California
San Diego County, California
Geography of Southern California
Geography of Imperial County, California
Geography of San Diego County, California